Lhohi as a place name may refer to:
 Lhohi (Dhaalu Atoll) (Republic of Maldives)
 Lhohi (Lhaviyani Atoll) (Republic of Maldives)
 Lhohi (Noonu Atoll) (Republic of Maldives)
 Lhohi (Raa Atoll) (Republic of Maldives)